The 1884 Pittsburgh Alleghenys season was the 3rd season of the Pittsburgh Alleghenys franchise. The Alleghenys finished 11th in the American Association with a record of 30–78.

Game log 

|- style="background:#fbb;"
| 1 || Thursday, May 1 || Philadelphia Athletics || 2–9 || 0–1
|- style="background:#fbb;"
| 2 || Friday, May 2 || Philadelphia Athletics || 2–11 || 0–2
|- style="background:#cfc;"
| 3 || Saturday, May 3 || Philadelphia Athletics || 9–8 || 1–2
|- style="background:#fbb;"
| 4 || Monday, May 5 || New York Metropolitans || 1–6 || 1–3
|- style="background:#fbb;"
| 5 || Wednesday, May 7 || New York Metropolitans || 1–8 || 1–4
|- style="background:#fbb;"
| 6 || Thursday, May 8 || New York Metropolitans || 1–8 || 1–5
|- style="background:#cfc;"
| 7 || Friday, May 9 || Brooklyn Atlantics || 8–2 || 2–5
|- style="background:#cfc;"
| 8 || Saturday, May 10 || Brooklyn Atlantics || 16–6 || 3–5
|- style="background:#cfc;"
| 9 || Monday, May 12 || Brooklyn Atlantics || 9–6 || 4–5
|- style="background:#fbb;"
| 10 || Tuesday, May 13 || @ New York Metropolitans || 4–13 || 4–6
|- style="background:#fbb;"
| 11 || Wednesday, May 14 || @ New York Metropolitans || 2–4 || 4–7
|- style="background:#fbb;"
| 12 || Thursday, May 15 || @ New York Metropolitans || 0–8 || 4–8
|- style="background:#cfc;"
| 13 || Saturday, May 17 || @ Brooklyn Atlantics || 4–3 || 5–8
|- style="background:#fbb;"
| 14 || Monday, May 19 || @ Brooklyn Atlantics || 6–11 || 5–9
|- style="background:#cfc;"
| 15 || Tuesday, May 20 || @ Brooklyn Atlantics || 10–1 || 6–9
|- style="background:#fbb;"
| 16 || Thursday, May 22 || @ Philadelphia Athletics || 1–8 || 6–10
|- style="background:#fbb;"
| 17 || Friday, May 23 || @ Philadelphia Athletics || 4–9 || 6–11
|- style="background:#fbb;"
| 18 || Saturday, May 24 || @ Philadelphia Athletics || 1–10 || 6–12
|- style="background:#fbb;"
| 19 || Wednesday, May 28 || Columbus Buckeyes || 0–5 || 6–13
|- style="background:#fbb;"
| 20 || Thursday, May 29 || Columbus Buckeyes || 0–5 || 6–14
|- style="background:#cfc;"
| 21 || Friday, May 30 || Toledo Blue Stockings || 8–6 || 7–14
|- style="background:#fbb;"
| 22 || Friday, May 30 || Toledo Blue Stockings || 1–2 || 7–15
|- style="background:#cfc;"
| 23 || Saturday, May 31 || Toledo Blue Stockings || 5–3 || 8–15
|-

|- style="background:#fbb;"
| 24 || Tuesday, Jun 3 || Indianapolis Hoosiers || 2–3 || 8–16
|- style="background:#cfc;"
| 25 || Wednesday, Jun 4 || Indianapolis Hoosiers || 11–6 || 9–16
|- style="background:#fbb;"
| 26 || Thursday, Jun 5 || Indianapolis Hoosiers || 10–11 || 9–17
|- style="background:#fbb;"
| 27 || Saturday, Jun 7 || St. Louisville Eclipseis Browns || 5–13 || 9–18
|- style="background:#fbb;"
| 28 || Monday, Jun 9 || St. Louisville Eclipseis Browns || 3–9 || 9–19
|- style="background:#fbb;"
| 29 || Wednesday, Jun 11 || St. Louisville Eclipseis Browns || 0–3 || 9–20
|- style="background:#fbb;"
| 30 || Thursday, Jun 12 || Cincinnati Red Stockings || 5–7 || 9–21
|- style="background:#cfc;"
| 31 || Friday, Jun 13 || Cincinnati Red Stockings || 2–0 || 10–21
|- style="background:#fbb;"
| 32 || Monday, Jun 16 || Louisville Eclipse || 3–7 || 10–22
|- style="background:#fbb;"
| 33 || Tuesday, Jun 17 || Louisville Eclipse || 6–7 || 10–23
|- style="background:#cfc;"
| 34 || Wednesday, Jun 18 || Louisville Eclipse || 6–2 || 11–23
|- style="background:#fbb;"
| 35 || Thursday, Jun 19 || Cincinnati Red Stockings || 1–7 || 11–24
|- style="background:#fbb;"
| 36 || Friday, Jun 20 || Columbus Buckeyes || 3–6 || 11–25
|- style="background:#fbb;"
| 37 || Saturday, Jun 21 || @ Cincinnati Red Stockings || 0–5 || 11–26
|- style="background:#fbb;"
| 38 || Sunday, Jun 22 || @ Cincinnati Red Stockings || 2–4 || 11–27
|- style="background:#fbb;"
| 39 || Tuesday, Jun 24 || @ Cincinnati Red Stockings || 0–12 || 11–28
|- style="background:#fbb;"
| 40 || Thursday, Jun 26 || @ Columbus Buckeyes || 3–6 || 11–29
|- style="background:#fbb;"
| 41 || Friday, Jun 27 || @ Columbus Buckeyes || 1–4 || 11–30
|- style="background:#fbb;"
| 42 || Saturday, Jun 28 || @ Columbus Buckeyes || 3–4 || 11–31
|- style="background:#cfc;"
| 43 || Monday, Jun 30 || @ Toledo Blue Stockings || 4–3 || 12–31
|-

|- style="background:#fbb;"
| 44 || Tuesday, Jul 1 || @ Toledo Blue Stockings || 3–5 || 12–32
|- style="background:#cfc;"
| 45 || Wednesday, Jul 2 || @ Toledo Blue Stockings || 8–7 || 13–32
|- style="background:#fbb;"
| 46 || Friday, Jul 4 || @ Indianapolis Hoosiers || 4–15 || 13–33
|- style="background:#cfc;"
| 47 || Friday, Jul 4 || @ Indianapolis Hoosiers || 3–1 || 14–33
|- style="background:#fbb;"
| 48 || Saturday, Jul 5 || @ Indianapolis Hoosiers || 3–12 || 14–34
|- style="background:#fbb;"
| 49 || Sunday, Jul 6 || @ St. Louisville Eclipseis Browns || 6–12 || 14–35
|- style="background:#fbb;"
| 50 || Tuesday, Jul 8 || @ St. Louisville Eclipseis Browns || 1–7 || 14–36
|- style="background:#fbb;"
| 51 || Thursday, Jul 10 || @ St. Louisville Eclipseis Browns || 2–11 || 14–37
|- style="background:#fbb;"
| 52 || Saturday, Jul 12 || @ Louisville Eclipse || 1–4 || 14–38
|- style="background:#cfc;"
| 53 || Sunday, Jul 13 || @ Louisville Eclipse || 5–4 || 15–38
|- style="background:#fbb;"
| 54 || Monday, Jul 14 || @ Louisville Eclipse || 0–6 || 15–39
|- style="background:#cfc;"
| 55 || Thursday, Jul 17 || Washington Nationals || 3–2 || 16–39
|- style="background:#cfc;"
| 56 || Friday, Jul 18 || Washington Nationals || 4–2 || 17–39
|- style="background:#cfc;"
| 57 || Saturday, Jul 19 || Washington Nationals || 7–1 || 18–39
|- style="background:#fbb;"
| 58 || Monday, Jul 21 || @ Washington Nationals || 3–12 || 18–40
|- style="background:#cfc;"
| 59 || Tuesday, Jul 22 || @ Washington Nationals || 9–8 || 19–40
|- style="background:#fbb;"
| 60 || Wednesday, Jul 23 || @ Brooklyn Atlantics || 4–10 || 19–41
|- style="background:#cfc;"
| 61 || Thursday, Jul 24 || @ Brooklyn Atlantics || 6–2 || 20–41
|- style="background:#fbb;"
| 62 || Saturday, Jul 26 || @ New York Metropolitans || 3–9 || 20–42
|- style="background:#fbb;"
| 63 || Monday, Jul 28 || @ New York Metropolitans || 1–9 || 20–43
|- style="background:#fbb;"
| 64 || Wednesday, Jul 30 || Baltimore Orioles || 2–9 || 20–44
|-

|- style="background:#cfc;"
| 65 || Friday, Aug 1 || Philadelphia Athletics || 4–3 || 21–44
|- style="background:#fbb;"
| 66 || Saturday, Aug 2 || Philadelphia Athletics || 2–7 || 21–45
|- style="background:#fbb;"
| 67 || Monday, Aug 4 || Brooklyn Atlantics || 2–4 || 21–46
|- style="background:#fbb;"
| 68 || Wednesday, Aug 6 || Brooklyn Atlantics || 0–6 || 21–47
|- style="background:#fbb;"
| 69 || Thursday, Aug 7 || @ Philadelphia Athletics || 1–7 || 21–48
|- style="background:#fbb;"
| 70 || Saturday, Aug 9 || @ Philadelphia Athletics || 2–13 || 21–49
|- style="background:#fbb;"
| 71 || Monday, Aug 11 || @ Baltimore Orioles || 4–10 || 21–50
|- style="background:#fbb;"
| 72 || Tuesday, Aug 12 || @ Baltimore Orioles || 3–4 || 21–51
|- style="background:#fbb;"
| 73 || Wednesday, Aug 13 || Baltimore Orioles || 0–8 || 21–52
|- style="background:#fbb;"
| 74 || Thursday, Aug 14 || Baltimore Orioles || 4–14 || 21–53
|- style="background:#fbb;"
| 75 || Saturday, Aug 16 || New York Metropolitans || 0–6 || 21–54
|- style="background:#cfc;"
| 76 || Monday, Aug 18 || New York Metropolitans || 1–0 || 22–54
|- style="background:#fbb;"
| 77 || Friday, Aug 22 || @ Baltimore Orioles || 6–8 || 22–55
|- style="background:#fbb;"
| 78 || Saturday, Aug 23 || @ Baltimore Orioles || 3–7 || 22–56
|- style="background:#fbb;"
| 79 || Monday, Aug 25 || @ Baltimore Orioles || 3–9 || 22–57
|- style="background:#ffc;"
| 80 || Tuesday, Aug 26 || @ Richmond Virginians || 4–4 || 22–57
|- style="background:#fbb;"
| 81 || Wednesday, Aug 27 || @ Richmond Virginians || 5–7 || 22–58
|- style="background:#cfc;"
| 82 || Thursday, Aug 28 || @ Richmond Virginians || 5–0 || 23–58
|-

|- style="background:#fbb;"
| 83 || Monday, Sep 1 || Richmond Virginians || 5–10 || 23–59
|- style="background:#fbb;"
| 84 || Tuesday, Sep 2 || Richmond Virginians || 1–2 || 23–60
|- style="background:#fbb;"
| 85 || Wednesday, Sep 3 || Richmond Virginians || 4–8 || 23–61
|- style="background:#fbb;"
| 86 || Thursday, Sep 4 || @ Toledo Blue Stockings || 2–4 || 23–62
|- style="background:#cfc;"
| 87 || Saturday, Sep 6 || @ Toledo Blue Stockings || 10–3 || 24–62
|- style="background:#cfc;"
| 88 || Sunday, Sep 7 || @ Columbus Buckeyes || 7–3 || 25–62
|- style="background:#fbb;"
| 89 || Wednesday, Sep 10 || @ Columbus Buckeyes || 2–10 || 25–63
|- style="background:#fbb;"
| 90 || Thursday, Sep 11 || @ Cincinnati Red Stockings || 1–11 || 25–64
|- style="background:#fbb;"
| 91 || Saturday, Sep 13 || @ Cincinnati Red Stockings || 6–11 || 25–65
|- style="background:#fbb;"
| 92 || Tuesday, Sep 16 || @ Louisville Eclipse || 1–6 || 25–66
|- style="background:#fbb;"
| 93 || Wednesday, Sep 17 || @ Louisville Eclipse || 1–4 || 25–67
|- style="background:#fbb;"
| 94 || Thursday, Sep 18 || @ St. Louisville Eclipseis Browns || 4–6 || 25–68
|- style="background:#fbb;"
| 95 || Saturday, Sep 20 || @ St. Louisville Eclipseis Browns || 1–4 || 25–69
|- style="background:#cfc;"
| 96 || Sunday, Sep 21 || @ Indianapolis Hoosiers || 4–2 || 26–69
|- style="background:#fbb;"
| 97 || Wednesday, Sep 24 || Baltimore Orioles || 6–8 || 26–70
|- style="background:#cfc;"
| 98 || Thursday, Sep 25 || Indianapolis Hoosiers || 15–4 || 27–70
|- style="background:#cfc;"
| 99 || Saturday, Sep 27 || Indianapolis Hoosiers || 8–4 || 28–70
|- style="background:#cfc;"
| 100 || Monday, Sep 29 || Indianapolis Hoosiers || 2–0 || 29–70
|-

|- style="background:#cfc;"
| 101 || Wednesday, Oct 1 || St. Louisville Eclipseis Browns || 2–1 || 30–70
|- style="background:#fbb;"
| 102 || Thursday, Oct 2 || St. Louisville Eclipseis Browns || 5–10 || 30–71
|- style="background:#fbb;"
| 103 || Friday, Oct 3 || Columbus Buckeyes || 3–14 || 30–72
|- style="background:#fbb;"
| 104 || Saturday, Oct 4 || Columbus Buckeyes || 4–15 || 30–73
|- style="background:#ffc;"
| 105 || Monday, Oct 6 || Cincinnati Red Stockings || 8–8 || 30–73
|- style="background:#fbb;"
| 106 || Tuesday, Oct 7 || Cincinnati Red Stockings || 3–8 || 30–74
|- style="background:#fbb;"
| 107 || Thursday, Oct 9 || Toledo Blue Stockings || 3–9 || 30–75
|- style="background:#fbb;"
| 108 || Saturday, Oct 11 || Toledo Blue Stockings || 0–2 || 30–76
|- style="background:#fbb;"
| 109 || Tuesday, Oct 14 || Louisville Eclipse || 3–10 || 30–77
|- style="background:#fbb;"
| 110 || Wednesday, Oct 15 || Louisville Eclipse || 4–9 || 30–78
|-

|- style="text-align:center;"
| Legend:       = Win       = Loss       = Tie

 Season standings 

 Record vs. opponents 

 Roster 

 Player stats 
BattersNote: G = Games played; AB = At bats; H = Hits; Avg. = Batting average; HR = Home runs; RBI = Runs batted inPitchersNote: G = Games pitched; IP = Innings pitched; W = Wins; L = Losses; ERA = Earned run average; SO = Strikeouts''

References

External Links
Pittsburgh Alleghenys at Baseball Reference

Pittsburgh Pirates seasons
Pittsburgh Alleghenys season
Pittsburg Pir